BMG Production Music is an American production music company based in Santa Monica, California owned by BMG Rights Management, a subsidiary of German conglomerate Bertelsmann. Founded in 1993 as Immediate Music, it is best known for specializing in high-end trailer music for commercial motion pictures. The company's music has been featured in film trailers such as those for Avatar, Alien vs. Predator, Terminator Salvation, Pirates of the Caribbean: At World's End, The Ring, The Matrix franchise, The Lord of the Rings franchise and the Harry Potter films.

In 2007, Immediate received an Emmy for "Outstanding Music Composition in a Sports Program" for their work on the 2006 Winter Olympics. Immediate Music has its own band, Globus, that fuses cinematic orchestral music with contemporary and world music rhythms. In September 2017, Bertelsmann acquired Immediate Music and subsequently adopted its current name.

Organization 
Immediate Music was founded in 1993 by Jeffrey Fayman and Yoav Goren with their first trailer track for Carlito's Way. Originally starting out as making music for film trailers, in 2008 the company opened its libraries to the video game and advertising industries.

The company is based in Santa Monica, California. In addition to Immediate Music, they also operate 1 Revolution Music, a company founded in 2010 that specializes television soundtracks and trailers. Its record label, Imperativa Records that releases albums in the Epic Music genre to the public since 2006.

Discography 
Immediate Music has released a number of albums that incorporate a wide range of genres, none of which however are commercially available to the general public. The most well known of these is the Themes for Orchestra and Choir series which currently has three multi-disk volumes. For the month of December 2010, Immediate Music made their TFOAC volumes 2 and 3 CDs available for purchase by the public.

In 2012, Imperativa Records announced the Immediate Music catalog CDs are available for purchase with autographs signed by composers Yoav Goren and Jeffrey Fayman. The CDs such as Epic Choral Action #1, Themes For Orchestra And Choir #2: Abbey Road, and Themes For Orchestra And Choir #3 are on a limited year-end promotional run.

Studio albums

Industry release 

 30 Clicks North
 Action / Drama #1
 Action / Drama #2
 Action / Drama #3
 Action / Drama #4
 Action / Drama #5
 Act 1
 Amethyst Skies
 Ashes
 Black Room
 Broken Dreams
 Burning Drums
 Carnage
 Champion
 Cinematic Soundscapes
 Cinematic Tension And Horror #1
 Comedy #1
 Comedy #2
 Comedy #3
 Dark Hero: Uprising
 Decompression
 Dream Worlds
 Drums & Chants: Ritual
 Encounters
 Epic #1
 Epic #2
 Epic #3
 Epic Choral Action #1
 Epic: The Dark And The Light
 Existence
 Exosphere
 Exosphere II
 Fantasy And Imagination
 Fate Of Gods
 Fields Of Glory
 Final Escape
 Frenzy
 Grindhouse Serenade
 Horror / Sci-Fi #1
 Inferno
 Life Cycles
 Lumina
 Memories
 Night Terrors
 Omega
 Omega II
 Omega III
 On The Burden Of Being
 Orchestral Soundtrack
 Patriotic Covers
 Percussive Action #1
 Plosive: In Three Acts
 Quantum
 Redemption
 Revolt
 Romantic & Adventure #2
 Romantic Comedy, Romantic & Adventure #1
 Romantic Comedy #2
 Subliminal
 Subsonic
 Subversion
 Suspense & Drama #1
 Suspense & Drama #2
 Suspense & Drama #3
 Suspense & Drama #4
 Suspense & Drama #5
 Themes For Orchestra And Choir 1
 Themes For Orchestra And Choir 2
 Themes For Orchestra And Choir 3
 Themes For Orchestra And Choir 4
 Themes For Orchestra And Choir 5
  The Dark Web
 Trailer Beast: Heroes, Legends And Ogres
 Trailer DNA: Toolkit
 Trailer Rock Series: Hard Rock
 Trailer Rock Series: Pop Rock
 Trailer Rock Series: Post Rock
 Transformers And Terminators
 Trinity And Beyond
 Unique Organic Underscore
 Universe Number 7
 Youth Oriented #1
 Youth Oriented #2
 Youth Oriented #3
 Youth Oriented #4
 Youth Oriented #5
 Violations
 Wonder

Trailerhead (2008) (15 songs - 45 minutes 57 seconds) 

 Prometheus Rising
 An Epic Age – Based on "Epicon"
 Lacrimosa Dominae – Based on "Lacrimosa" and "Preliator"
 Serenata Immortale – Based on "Serenata" and "Orchard of Mines"
 Imperitum – Based on "Imperativa"
 Trial of the Archangel – Based on "Witch Hunt" and "Archangel"
 Prelude to Paradise – Based on "Prelude" and "Prelude (On Earth As In Heaven)"
 The Reluctant Warrior
 Spiritus Omnia – Based on "Spiritus Elektros", "Spiritus Sancte" and "Spiritus Khayyam"
 Fides en Lucius Dei – Based on "Lucius Dei" and "Diem ex Dei"
 Shield of Faith – Based on "Armed By Faith" and "Take Me Away"
 Onward to Freedom
 Empyrean Mercenaries – Based on "Heaven's Warriors"
 Generations
 Age of Discovery

Trailerhead: Saga (2010) 
Trailerhead: Saga is Immediate's second studio album, released digitally on July 20, 2010.

 Hymnus Orbis – Based on "Hymn"
 Glory Seeker – Based on "Defcon"
 Libertas – Based on "Liberation"
 Invictus – Based on "Divide and Conquer" and "Black Parade"
 Oratio Sanctus – Based on "Holy" and "Madre Terra"
 Emergence Of Empire – Based on "Rising Empire"
 In League With Cerberus – Based on "Final Omen 2", "Monolith", and "Blasphemy 2.0"
 Darkness On The Edge Of Power – Based on "Dark side of Power"
 Ashes Of War – Based on "Love And War"
 World On A String – Based on "Global Crisis #1"
 Salvation For A Proud Nation – Based on "Proud Nation" and "Salvation"
 Fatum Plebis – Based on "O Destina"
 Darkness On The Edge Of Power (Live)
 Surrender To Hope – Based on "Believe"

Trailerhead: Triumph (2012) 
Trailerhead: Triumph is Immediate's third studio album, released digitally on October 30, 2012.

 Destiny of the Chosen - Based on "Epic Expedition" and "Rise of the Chosen"
 Journey to Glory - Based on "In Memoriam" and "Journey To The Front"
 Tales of the Electric Romeo - Based on "Electric Romeo" and "Europa"
 Battle For The Soul of the Universe - Based on "Mother of All Battles"
 Ode To Power - Based on "With Great Power"
 State Of Endless Grace
 Falling Skies - Based on "Catch the Falling Sky"
 Rex Imperium - Based on "Rex Eternum"
 Tears of Blood
 A Nation Born - Based on "Birth of a Nation"
 Burden Of Atlas - Based on "Atlas" and "The Promise" 
 How To Control The Dream
 Incensus - Based on "Fahrenheit"
 Mercurial - Based on "A Grand Inqusition", "Mercuito", and "A Thousand Deaths"
 Excalibur - Based on "Return of the King"
 Ageless Empires 
 Sanctus Immortale - Based on "Iron Warrior" and "Doomsday"
 Pandora‘s Heaven - Based on "Pandora"
 Rex Imperium Reprise - (Rex Eternum)
 The Lords Shall Rule - Based on "Lords of the Realm"
 Novus Arcana - Based on "Arcana"
 Barbarians - Moniker remix (bonus track)
 Salveus - Moniker remix (bonus track)

Epic Olympic Dreams (2012) 
Epic Olympic Dreams is Immediate's fourth studio album, released digitally on July 9, 2012. As of January 2017, is no longer available.

 Heroes Crusade
 For Honor, for Glory, Forever
 Glorious Victories
 On the Eve of the Games
 Let the Games Begin
 Pride on the Platform
 Union of Warriors
 World on a String
 The Brave and the Proud
 Spirit of the Ancients
 Salvation of a Proud Nation
 Triumphant Ceremony
 Victory for the Hometown Hero	
 Surrender to Hope
 Legacy of Champions	
 Voyage to the Games	
 Onward to Freedom
 Quest for Gold
 Echoes of Greatness
 Dreams of my Country

The Demon Within (2013) 
The Demon Within is Immediate's fifth studio album, released digitally on October 21, 2013. As of January 2017, it is no longer available.

 Tormentor
 Witch Hunt
 Shadow Killer
 Infernalis
 Fatal Vision
 Possessed
 Sensing Human Prey
 The Demon Code
 Dead Ringer
 Curse Of The Oracle
 Fear
 The Gathering
 Unholy In Thee
 Countdown To Oblivion
 Find Your Way Out
 Prophets Of Doom
 Incubus
 Slash And Burn
 Why Is This Happening
 The World We Have Left
 Death Box
 In League With Cerberus

Trailerhead: Nu Epiq (2014) 
Trailerhead: Nu Epiq is Immediate's sixth studio album, released digitally on May 27, 2014.

 Protectors Of Truth – Based on "Vindicator"
 From The Ashes We Will Rise – Based on "The Brave Shall Rise"
 This War Must End – Based on "We Made This War"
 Purple Heart - Based on "The Tomb"
 Wolf Moon Uprising – Based on "Wolf Moon 2012"
 A Life Extraordinary – Based on "How To Control The Dream" and "Eclipse"
 Saga Of The Immortals – Based on "Immortal Legends"
 Majestic – Based on "Kingmaker"
 The Unlikeliest Of Heroes - Based on "Unlikely Hero"
 Translucent
 Prologue To A Conquest – Based on "Counquest of Kingdoms"
 Night Of The Avenging Angels - Based on "Avenging Angel"
 Deliverance For All – Based on "End of a Dark Ages"
 One Destiny To Follow
 Dark Times Are Upon Us - Based on "These Are Dark Times"
 The Fate Of Our Brave – Based on "Fate Of The World"
 Falling Into Inertia
 This World Of Wonders – Based on "Voyage of Wonder"
 Virtue At All Costs

Futbol Is Epic! (2016) 
Futbol Is Epic! is Immediate Music's seventh studio album released in 2016.

 Milan, Milan!
 Alles Paris Saint-Germain
 You'll Never Walk Alone (feat. Matty McCloskey & Julien Jorgensen)
 Cant del Barca
 Stern des Sudens
 Glory, Glory, Man United
 Storia di un grande amore
 Tek Buyuk Galatasaray
 Hymne Olympique Lyonnais
 Arsenal, We're On You're Side
 Leuchte auf mein Stern Borussia
 Blue Is the Colour
 Vechernyaya Pesnya (Zenit)
 Gluck auf, def Steiger kommt
 !Hala Madrid! (Himno del Centenario)

Trailerhead: Catharsis (2021) 
Catharsis is Immediate's seventh studio album, released digitally on July 30, 2021.

 The Rock Upon Which All Waves Crash
 Lockdown
 Short Goodbyes and Long Memories
 Super Spreader
 Origins of Chaos
 For Those Who Don't Get to Say Goodbye
 Collective Rebirth
 Uprising Catalyst
 Darkest Before Dawn
 Herd Immunity
 What Was Lost Will Not Be Forgotten
 Covid Elegy

See also 
 Globus (music)

References

External links 
 

1993 establishments in California
Music production companies
Production music